The 48th British Academy Film Awards, given by the British Academy of Film and Television Arts in 1995, honoured the best films of 1994.

Mike Newell's Four Weddings and a Funeral won the award for Best Film. It also won the awards for Best Director (Mike Newell), Actor (Hugh Grant) and Supporting Actress (Kristin Scott Thomas). Pulp Fiction won the awards for Best Supporting Actor (Samuel L. Jackson) and Original Screenplay. Susan Sarandon won the BAFTA Award for Best Actress for her role in The Client.

Winners and nominees

Statistics

See also
 67th Academy Awards
 20th César Awards
 47th Directors Guild of America Awards
 8th European Film Awards
 52nd Golden Globe Awards
 6th Golden Laurel Awards
 15th Golden Raspberry Awards
 9th Goya Awards
 10th Independent Spirit Awards
 21st Saturn Awards
 1st Screen Actors Guild Awards
 47th Writers Guild of America Awards

References 

Film048
BAFTA Awards
BAFTA Awards
1994 awards in the United Kingdom